Nathan Cohn (January 2, 1907 – November 16, 1989) was an American electrical engineer best known for his work in the development of automatic control techniques for interconnected electric power systems. He worked for Leeds & Northrup for 48 years.

Biography
Nathan Cohn was born on January 2, 1907, in Hartford, Connecticut. He received an S.B. in electrical engineering from the Massachusetts Institute of Technology in 1927.

Upon graduation, Cohn began working for the Leeds & Northrup Company. He worked within the Instrumentation and Controls for Electric Power Application Division. Cohn served as manager of the company’s offices in San Francisco and Chicago until 1955 when he returned to Philadelphia to serve as manager of the Market Development Division. He was named Vice President of Technical Affairs in 1958, Senior Vice President in 1968, and Executive Vice President for Research and Corporate Development in 1967 until his retirement from the position in 1972. He also served on the Board of Directors from 1963-1975 when he retired as corporate director.

Cohn was a member of Eta Kappa Nu, Sigma Xi, and Tau Beta Pi. He died on November 16, 1989, in Scottsdale, Arizona.

Honors and awards
 IEEE Edison Medal in 1982
 Fellow, IEEE
 Fellow, Franklin Institute
 Member, National Academy of Engineering (1969)
 IEEE Lamme Medal (1968)

External links 

1907 births
1989 deaths
American electrical engineers
Fellow Members of the IEEE
IEEE Edison Medal recipients
IEEE Lamme Medal recipients
20th-century American engineers
Control theorists